Treston is a given name. Notable people with the name include:

Treston Decoud (born 1993), American football player
Treston Thomison, American mixed martial artist